Vamoose may refer to:

 Vamoose Bus, a regional bus line in the northeastern United States
 Vamoose (yacht), a steam-powered ship built in 1890 for William Randolph Hearst